The 2002–03 Copa del Rey was the 101st staging of the Copa del Rey.

The competition started on 28 August 2002 and concluded on 28 June 2003 with the final, held at the Martinez Valero in Elche, in which Mallorca lifted the trophy for the first time ever with a 3–0 victory over Recreativo de Huelva.

Preliminary round

Round of 64

Round of 32

Round of 16

First leg

Quarter-finals

First leg

Second leg

Semi-finals

First leg

Second leg

Final

Top goalscorers

References

External links 
  rsssf.com
  linguasport.com

2002-03
1